Duncan Hines (March 26, 1880 – March 15, 1959) was an American pioneer of restaurant ratings for travelers. He is best known today for the brand of food products that bears his name.

Early life
Hines was born in Bowling Green, Kentucky, the son of a former Confederate soldier. His mother died when he was four, and he was raised by his grandmother. Hines attended Bowling Green Business University, which later merged with what is now Western Kentucky University, and worked in the American West for Wells Fargo and other companies before settling in Chicago.

Writing career

Hines worked as a traveling salesman for a Chicago printer, and he had eaten many meals on the road across the United States by 1935 when he was 55. At this time, there was no American interstate highway system and only a few chain restaurants, except in large populated areas. Therefore, travelers depended on local restaurants. Hines and his wife Florence began assembling a list for friends of several hundred good restaurants around the country.

The book proved so successful that Hines added another which recommended lodging.
In the late 1940s and early 1950s, Hines wrote the newspaper food column Adventures in Good Eating at Home, which appeared in newspapers across the US three times a week on Sunday, Tuesday, and Thursday. The column featured restaurant recipes adapted for home cooks that he had collected during his nationwide travels.

Entrepreneurial career
In 1952, Duncan Hines introduced Duncan Hines bread through the Durkee's Bakery Company of Homer, New York. Principals Michael C. Antil Sr., Albert Durkee, and Lena Durkee were the bakery proprietors. This was Duncan Hines' first foray into baked goods.

By 1953, Hines sold the right to use his name and the title of his book to Roy H. Park to form Hines-Park Foods, which licensed the name to a number of food-related businesses. The cake mix license was sold to Nebraska Consolidated Mills in Omaha, Nebraska, which developed and sold the first Duncan Hines cake mixes.

In 1957, Nebraska Consolidated Mills sold the cake mix business to the U.S. consumer products company Procter & Gamble. The company expanded the business to the national market and added a series of related products.

Also in 1957, Hines appeared as a guest challenger on the TV panel show To Tell the Truth.

Hines died of lung cancer in 1959, 11 days short of what would have been his 79th birthday. He was buried in Fairview Cemetery in Bowling Green, Kentucky, in the same series of Hines family plots as Thomas Hines.

Today

The Duncan Hines brand is now owned by Conagra Brands, the current name for Nebraska Consolidated Mills, which was the original owner of the brand. Conagra reacquired the brand through its acquisition, in 2018, of Pinnacle Foods which bought it from Procter & Gamble in 1997. 

Hines is widely honored in his hometown of Bowling Green, and a portion of U.S. Route 31W north of the city was named the Duncan Hines Highway after his death. A museum exhibit at Western Kentucky University's Kentucky Museum in Bowling Green showcases Duncan Hines.

Publications

Hines, Duncan (1955). Duncan Hines' Food Odyssey. Thomas Y. Crowell Company.

See also

Notes and references

Further reading
 Repackaged as

External links
 
 Duncan Hines brand website

1880 births
1959 deaths
20th-century American male writers
20th-century American non-fiction writers
American columnists
American food writers
American male non-fiction writers
Former Procter & Gamble brands
Writers from Bowling Green, Kentucky
Pinnacle Foods brands
Western Kentucky University alumni
Food product brands
Deaths from lung cancer in Kentucky